Fenoarivo Atsinanana (French: Fénérive Est) is a city (commune urbaine) in Madagascar.

It is the capital of the Analanjirofo region and of the district of Fenerive-Est.

Geography
It is situated at the East coast of Madagascar, about 103 km north of the city of Toamasina and 58 kms south of Soanierana-Ivongo along the National road 5 to Maroantsetra.

Economy
The region around Fenoarivo is one of the most important clove growing areas of Madagascar.
The city is also one of the most important sea resorts at the East coast.

History
In the 17th century it was a privateer's harbour.
Ratsimilaho, the first king of the Betsimisaraka, was the son of a pirate and a local princess. He is buried on the island Nosy Hely,  a former pirate's stronghold that can be visited today (Vohimasina).

Religion

 FJKM - Fiangonan'i Jesoa Kristy eto Madagasikara (Church of Jesus Christ in Madagascar)
 FLM - Fiangonana Loterana Malagasy (Malagasy Lutheran Church)
 Catholic Diocese (Cathedral of St. Maurice).

Museums
The Lampy Museum.

Gallery

References

Cities in Madagascar
Populated places in Analanjirofo
Regional capitals in Madagascar